APM Monaco is a fashion jewelry company. It was started in Monaco in 1982 by Ariane Prette.

History 

The company was started in Monaco in 1982 by Ariane Prette. In 1992, it moved its manufacturing to China. The company offices are in Hong Kong. In 2019, TPG Capital took a 30% stake in the company.

Stores were opened in Cannes and Rome in 2013. By 2015, there were more than 30 in various countries; in 2017, there were 130, including 75 in Asia and Australia, and by the end of 2018, there were 200 in 26 countries.

References   

Jewellery designers
Jewellery retailers
Companies established in 1982
Companies of Monaco
Privately held companies
1982 establishments in Monaco